Emanuel David Morales (born 8 May 1987) is an Argentine former professional footballer who played as a defender.

Career
Morales started his senior career in 2005 with CAI in Primera B Nacional, he remained with them until 2012 and made one hundred and thirty-four appearances whilst scoring three goals in the process. In his penultimate season, 2010–11, CAI were relegated to Torneo Argentino A. He subsequently spent 2011–12 out on loan with Primera B Nacional's Chacarita Juniors, making thirty-four appearances and scoring three times as Chacarita were relegated to Primera B Metropolitana; parent club CAI were also demoted from Torneo Argentino A to Torneo Argentino B. In July 2012, Chacarita signed Morales permanently.

He went on to score eight goals in ninety-two matches for Chacarita in three seasons in Primera B Metropolitana. The club were promoted back to Primera B Nacional for 2015, a season Morales spent out on loan with Argentine Primera División side Quilmes. He remained with Quilmes for the 2015 and 2016 campaigns, scoring one goal (versus Rosario Central) in sixteen games. On 30 September 2016, fellow Primera División team Huracán signed Morales. His debut arrived on 3 October during a win away against Atlético Tucumán. He featured once more for Huracán during the 2016–17 Primera División.

Morales left the club in August 2017 to join Los Andes on loan. However, he returned months later without featuring. His contract with Huracán initially ended on 30 June 2019, though was extended by a further twelve months due to Morales' health issues.

Personal life
In June 2020, it was revealed that Morales had been diagnosed with amyotrophic lateral sclerosis (ALS). He initially noticed changes in his body as far back as June 2017, though was only formally diagnosed in March 2018.

Career statistics
.

References

External links

1987 births
Living people
People from General Pico
People with motor neuron disease
Argentine footballers
Association football defenders
Primera Nacional players
Torneo Argentino A players
Primera B Metropolitana players
Argentine Primera División players
Comisión de Actividades Infantiles footballers
Chacarita Juniors footballers
Quilmes Atlético Club footballers
Club Atlético Huracán footballers
Club Atlético Los Andes footballers